Monte Santo António is a mountain in the southwestern part of the island Boa Vista in Cape Verde. At  elevation, it is the island's second highest point. Like Rocha Estância and Monte Estância, it rises steeply from the surrounding plains. It is part of a protected natural area under the statute of natural monument, covering .

See also
List of mountains in Cape Verde

References

External links

Santo Antonio
Santo Antonio
Santo Antonio